Ulrich Schöllkopf (11 October 1927 – 6 November 1998) was a German chemist and together with Georg Wittig discovered the Wittig reaction in 1956. Later in 1981 he published the synthesis method for amino acids known as the Bislactimether method or Schöllkopf method.
 
Schöllkopf studied with Georg Wittig at the University of Tübingen where he received his PhD with work on the Wittig reaction in 1956 and received his habilitation at the University of Heidelberg with Wittig in 1961. He became professor at the University of Göttingen.

References

1927 births
1998 deaths
20th-century German chemists
People from the Free People's State of Württemberg